The New England Immortals was the first All-Star representative Rugby League Football team made up of the top American players from all Rugby League teams in the six New England states, and those US athletes who come from the region.

Club Motto: "Do not follow where the path may lead. Go instead where there is no path, and leave a trail."
-  Ralph Waldo Emerson

History

AMNRL Years (2010)
The New England Immortals were founded in 2010 and consisted of the top players from the New England-based teams of the AMNRL - the Boston Thirteens, Connecticut Wildcats and the New Haven Warriors. Their logo is based on the Robert Gould Shaw Memorial located on Boston Common at the corner of Beacon and Park Street in Boston, MA. Colonel Shaw commanded the 54th Massachusetts Infantry Regiment during the civil war. There are six stars which represent the six states that make up New England, while the red white and blue symbolize not only the national colors of the U.S., but also hardiness, valour, vigilance, and perseverance.

They played their inaugural match against the Canadian National Team at the 2010 AMNRL "War at the Shore", on July 31, 2010, defeating the Canadians 12-8 in a tightly contested match.

USARL Years (2011 - 2012)
After the AMNRL/USARL split in 2011, the Immortals joined the latter.  Due to the regulations of the separation outlined by the RLIF, only players registered in the AMNRL competition qualified for selection to the USA Tomahawks.  Under that same ruling, the Connecticut Wildcats (who opted to stay with the AMNRL) were dropped from selections to the Immortals.  The Immortals was now the only representative rugby available to USARL players. 
 
In April 2012, Head Coach Robin Peers named the 23-man roster that would make up the New England Immortal side that would represent their region against the British Royal Marines at Tucker Field in Cumberland, RI at the end of the month. Despite the loss of the Connecticut, the expanded player pool from newly formed Oneida FC and the Rhode Island Rebellion saw a new breed Immortals, with only three returning veterans.  The Immortals took to the field for their second match since their inception, and despite putting up a hard fight, they were out classed by the more experienced Marines, losing by a score of 68-12.

As of 2014, due to budgetary cuts and restructuring of the USARL competition,  the Immortals have not played a match since their loss to the Royal Marines.

Former member teams
 Boston Thirteens, Boston, Massachusetts
 Connecticut Wildcats, Greenwich, Connecticut
 New Haven Warriors, New Haven, Connecticut
 Oneida FC, Cambridge, Massachusetts
 Rhode Island Rebellion. Providence, Rhode Island

Former squads and match summaries

Notable players
The following is a list of New England Immortals who have played representative rugby (league or union) at the National level.
 Curtis Cunz — Former member of the USA Tomahawks with over ten test matches
 Nathan Debartolo —Played for the  South Sydney Rabbitohs in the top tier of the Australian NRL and former Tomahawk
 Lance Gaines — Named to the USA Tomahawks roster for the 2009 Atlantic Cup Test match against Jamaica
 Mike Schachter — member of the USA Tomahawks including three Colonial Cup tournaments
 Kenneth Stern — Represented the Philippines in both rugby union 7s and XVs, including the 2013 Rugby World Cup Sevens
 Kyle Winter — Former member of the Indonesian national rugby union team, including two appearances in the HSBC Asian Five Nations
 Shain Singleton — Former member of the USARL Hawks

References

External links
Official websites
 USA Rugby League

Rugby clubs established in 2010
American rugby league teams
Sports in New England
2010 establishments in the United States